Chenille may refer to:
 Chenille fabric
 Chenille plant, Acalypha hispida
 Chenille stem, a type of pipe cleaner
 Chenille Sisters, a US folk music group
 Chenille, a character from the DreamWorks Animation film Trolls